Alan Welle (born November 2. 1945) is an American politician and businessman.

Welle was born in Melrose, Minnesota and graduated from Melrose Senior High School. He served in the United States Army during the Vietnam War. Welle received his bachelor's degree in business education from St. Cloud State University and a bachelor's degree in business education from the University of Minnesota. He moved to Willmar, Minnesota with his wife and family. Welle was in the lumber business and was a business instructor. He served in the Minnesota House of Representatives from 1983 to 1994 and was a Democrat.

References

1945 births
Living people
People from Melrose, Minnesota
People from Willmar, Minnesota
Businesspeople from Minnesota
Military personnel from Minnesota
St. Cloud State University alumni
University of Minnesota alumni
Democratic Party members of the Minnesota House of Representatives